Andri Raffaelo Berenger (born 29 August 1991), is a Sri Lankan cricketer. He is a right-handed batsman. He was born in Colombo. He has played for the United Arab Emirates and for Qatar.

Personal life
Berenger was born in Colombo on 29 August 1991. His father Kenham Berenger was a Sri Lankan boxing champion. He grew up in the UAE where his parents were expatriate workers. Berenger represented the UAE at the Under-15 Gulf Cup in Bahrain before winning a sports scholarship to attend St. Peter's College, Colombo.

Cricket career

Sri Lanka
Berenger represented the Sri Lanka national under-19 cricket team at the 2010 Under-19 Cricket World Cup in New Zealand.

Berenger made his cricketing debut in a List A match for Seeduwa Raddoluwa in December 2008 against Moratuwa Sports Club. Later in the same week, he made a single first-class appearance for the side, in the 2008-09 Premier Championship.

Berenger later played for Sinhalese Sports Club and Colombo Cricket Club.

United Arab Emirates
He made his One Day International debut for the United Arab Emirates against Afghanistan on 28 November 2014. He represented the UAE at the 2015 Cricket World Cup in Australia and New Zealand.

Qatar
In October 2021, he was named in Qatar's Twenty20 International (T20I) squad for the Group A matches in the 2021 ICC Men's T20 World Cup Asia Qualifier. He made his T20I debut on 23 October 2021, for Qatar against Bahrain.

References

1991 births
Living people
Cricketers from Colombo
Sri Lankan cricketers
Emirati cricketers
Qatari cricketers
Qatar Twenty20 International cricketers
United Arab Emirates One Day International cricketers
Seeduwa Raddoluwa Cricket Club cricketers
Sri Lanka Cricket Combined XI cricketers
Colombo Cricket Club cricketers
Alumni of St. Peter's College, Colombo
Cricketers at the 2015 Cricket World Cup
Sri Lankan emigrants to the United Arab Emirates
Sri Lankan emigrants to Qatar
Sri Lankan expatriate sportspeople in the United Arab Emirates
Sri Lankan expatriate sportspeople in Qatar
Dual international cricketers